Maryam Abacha American University of Niger, acronym (MAAUN). It is the first English speaking university in the Republic of Niger and also the first bilingual university in the Sub-Saharan Africa. it is a large private International university situated in Maradi, Niger. second largest city in Niger Republic, is an institution with a wide range of programs, faculties and departments, offering undergraduate and post graduate degrees in Applied and Basic sciences, in Liberal Arts, in Social and Management sciences. It is a university with a population of over ten thousand under graduates and more than five thousand post graduate students.

History
The university was founded in 2013 by Professor Adamu Abubakar Gwarzo, a renowned journalist in  Maradi, Niger. with the mission to provide opportunities for teaming youths to acquire knowledge and skills in different fields and professions, for them to prepare themselves for life challenges and decide what to do with their knowledge; either be self employed, join the private sector or seek employment in the public service. The university is named after the wife of former Nigerian President Sani Abacha, Maryam Abacha, based on her efforts to mobilize and support African countries. It is recognized by the Nigerian Government Federal Ministry of Education and accredited by the Accreditation Service for International Colleges (ASIC) and the National University Commission (NUC). It is a member of the American Council on Education (ACE). 

MAAUN is a member of International Association of Universities (an affiliation of UNESCO) Paris.

MAAUN has a life membership with International Academic and Management Association (IAMA) India.

MAAUN is a member of Association of African Universities (AAU) Ghana

MAAUN is a member of Association of African Private Universities (AAPU). Nigeria

Faculties

Faculty Social and Management Science 
Bachelor of Science (B.Sc) - Political Science
Bachelor of Science (B.Sc) - International Relations
Bachelor of Art (B.A) - Public Administration
Bachelor of Science (B.Sc) - Sociology
Bachelor of Art (B.A) - Mass Communication

Faculty of Business Studies 
Bachelor of Science (B.Sc) - Accounting
Bachelor of Science (B.Sc) - Business administration
Bachelor of Science (B.Sc) - International Trade and Economics
Bachelor of Science (B.Sc) - International Economic and Finance

Faculty of Health Sciences 
Bachelor of Science (B.Sc) - Environmental Health and safety
Bachelor of Science (B.Sc) - Community Health and Development
Bachelor of Science (B.Sc) - Nursing.
Bachelor of Science (B.Sc) - Public Health
Bachelor of medical laboratory science  (BMLS) - Medical Laboratory Science.
Bachelor of Medical and Bachelor of Surgical-(MBBS)

Faculty of Languages 
Bachelor of Art (B.A) - French
Bachelor of Art (B.A) - English

Faculty of Law 
Bachelor of Art (BA) - Law (LLB)

Faculty of Applied Science and Engineering 
BSc. Computer Engineering
BSc. Computer Science
BSc. Information Technology
BSc. Software Engineering
BSc. Cyber Security
BSc. Animal health Science

School of Post Graduate Studies 
M.Sc Nursing
Master in Public Health
Master in Business Administration
Masters in International Relations and Diplomacy
MSc Environmental Health
M.A. French
Master in International Law

References

 Universities in Niger